Cyperus trigonellus is a species of sedge that is native to eastern parts of Africa.

See also 
 List of Cyperus species

References 

trigonellus
Plants described in 1951
Flora of Sudan
Flora of Burundi
Flora of Kenya
Flora of Malawi
Flora of Rwanda
Flora of Tanzania
Flora of Uganda
Flora of Zambia
Flora of Zimbabwe
Taxa named by Karl Suessenguth